Siddhalepa is the trademark of a herbal balm that is believed to help to relieve body aches and pains. It is produced in Sri Lanka based on the forty five hundred year old medicinal practices of the subcontinent, and was formally formulated in 1934. The effectiveness of this balm has now been scientifically tested as well.

History 
With a sum of RS. 2,500 Victor Hettigoda, a trained Ayurvedic physician began production of this balm in 1971. Hettigoda had spent 12 years under his father's tutelage learning the ancient secrets of Ayurveda. His father, also a physician, had in turn learned the ancient science from his father and so it went back tens of thousands of years. Hettigoda first sold the product by traveling around the country convincing boutique owners and small retailers of its effectiveness. His business has extended today to other products such as soaps and toothpastes.

Hendrick De Silva Hettigoda, after studying Ayurveda and Jyothisha (called astrology in English) from his father proceeded to India to continue his studies under the Yogis (a traditional Bharathic title for those who had transcended awareness and time) in sacred ashrams at the foothills of the Himalayas. He spent over 15 years in India perfecting his knowledge of Ayurveda and Jyothisha. An expert astrologer, he was elected President of the Astrological Society of Sri Lanka at the time .

Healthcare in Sri Lanka